Evan Bouchard (born October 20, 1999) is a Canadian professional ice hockey defenceman currently playing for the Edmonton Oilers of the National Hockey League (NHL). In the 2018 NHL Entry Draft, Bouchard was selected 10th overall by the Oilers.

Playing career

Junior
Bouchard was drafted in the first round, 17th overall, in the 2015 OHL Priority Selection by the London Knights. He helped London capture the OHL Championship and 2016 Memorial Cup in his first year with the organization. Bouchard was named captain of the Knights for the 2017–18 OHL season. At the conclusion of the year, Bouchard was named a finalist for the Max Kaminsky Trophy as Defenceman of the Year and the Red Tilson Trophy as MVP of the OHL.

Professional

Bouchard was selected in the first round, tenth overall by the Edmonton Oilers in the 2018 NHL Entry Draft. A few weeks later on July 17, the Oilers signed Bouchard to a three-year, entry-level contract.

On October 25, 2018, Bouchard became the youngest Oiler defenceman in history to record a goal when he scored in a 4–1 win over the Washington Capitals. He had turned 19 five days before the game. After seven games with the Oilers, he was returned to the Knights on November 2.

Despite only skating in 45 games for the Knights during the 2018–19 season, Bouchard recorded 16 goals and 53 points. He added another 21 points in eleven postseason games. On April 25, 2019, Bouchard was named the winner of the Max Kaminsky Trophy as the league's top defenceman.

Due to the COVID-19 pandemic's affect on the AHL, he spent part of the 2020–21 season with the Södertälje SK of Sweden's HockeyAllsvenskan. He then joined the Oilers for the shortened regular season, though it was noted that he had some difficulty getting ice time despite solid play.

In the 2021-22 season, Bouchard solidified his place in the roster, managing 12 goals and 31 assists in 81 regular season games, pairing alongside former Blackhawk defenseman Duncan Keith while also quarterbacking the team's second power play unit. 35 of his points came at even strength play, ranked fourteenth among NHL defensemen. The Oilers qualified for the 2022 Stanley Cup playoffs, making a deep run to the Western Conference Final before losing to the Colorado Avalanche.

International play
On December 3, Bouchard was loaned to Team Canada to compete for a roster spot on their 2019 World Junior Ice Hockey Championships team. On December 25, Bouchard was named an alternate captain for Team Canada, along with Jaret Anderson-Dolan and Ian Mitchell, for the 2019 World Junior Ice Hockey Championships.

Career statistics

Regular season and playoffs

International

Awards and honors

References

External links

1999 births
Living people
Bakersfield Condors players
Canadian ice hockey defencemen
Edmonton Oilers draft picks
Edmonton Oilers players
Ice hockey people from Ontario
London Knights players
National Hockey League first-round draft picks
Sportspeople from Oakville, Ontario
Södertälje SK players